The Normand river is a freshwater tributary of the Cyriac River, flowing in the unorganized territory of Lac-Ministuk, in the Le Fjord-du-Saguenay Regional County Municipality, in the administrative region of Saguenay–Lac-Saint-Jean, in the province of Quebec, in Canada. The upper and intermediate course of the Normand River crosses the Laurentides Wildlife Reserve.

The Normand River is accessible by route 175; other secondary forest roads have been developed in the sector for forestry and recreational tourism activities.

Forestry is the primary economic activity in the sector; recreational tourism, second.

The surface of the Normand River is usually frozen from the end of November to the beginning of April, however the safe circulation on the ice is generally done from mid-December to the end of March.

Geography 
The main watersheds adjacent to the Normand River are:
 north side: Cyriac River, Simoncouche Lake, Simoncouche River, Kenogami Lake, Saguenay River;
 east side: Cyriac River, Lac des Îlets, Grimard lake, Cyriac lake, Lecompte lake, rivière du Moulin, Bras Sec;
 south side: Chavary lake, Ministuk lake, Petite rivière Pikauba, Lévesque lake, Yvette lake;
 west side: Hector stream, Richelieu lake, Petite rivière Pikauba, Minustuk lake, Cyriac lake, Pikauba River.

The Normand River has its source in Normand Lake. The northern mouth of Lake Prud’homme is located at:
  southwest of Grimard Lake;
  north-east of a curve of the Pikauba River;
  north-west of Ministuk Lake;
  west of route 175;
  south of the confluence of the Normand river and the Cyriac river;
  south-west of Lac des Îlets.

  north-east in a deep valley to the outlet (coming from the south-west) of lakes Villeray and Grimard;
  north in a deep valley, up to a bend in the river;
  northward passing between two mountains and bending eastward, to the outlet (coming from the east) of an unidentified lake;
  northwards, to a stream (coming from the west);
  towards the northeast by forming a loop towards the east, until its mouth.

The Normand River flows onto the southwest bank of the Cyriac River. This confluence is located at:

  southeast of the confluence of Hector brook and Cyriac River;
  southwest of route 175;
  southwest of Lac des Îlets;
  east of the confluence of the Jean-Boivin River and the Petit rivière Jean-Boivin;
  south-east of the confluence of the Cyriac River and Kenogami Lake;
  south of the barrage de Portage-des-Roches;
  south of the confluence of the Chicoutimi River and the Saguenay River.

Toponymy 
The toponym "Normand river" was formalized on December 5, 1968, at the Place Names Bank of the Commission de toponymie du Québec.

Notes and references

Appendices

Related articles 
 Le Fjord-du-Saguenay Regional County Municipality
 Lac-Ministuk, an unorganized territory
 Laurentides Wildlife Reserve
 Cyriac River
 Kenogami Lake
 Chicoutimi River
 Saguenay River
St. Lawrence River
 List of rivers of Quebec

Rivers of Saguenay–Lac-Saint-Jean
Le Fjord-du-Saguenay Regional County Municipality
Laurentides Wildlife Reserve